NGC 7603 is a spiral Seyfert galaxy in the constellation Pisces. It is listed (as Arp 92) in the Atlas of Peculiar Galaxies. It is interacting with the smaller elliptical galaxy PGC 71041 nearby.

This galaxy pair has long been a cornerstone for those who are critical of the view that the universe is expanding, and advocates for non-standard cosmology such as Halton Arp, Fred Hoyle, and others. This is due to the position of two quasars, one at each edge of the filament connecting the two galaxies, with much more redshift than either galaxy.

References

External links 
 
 SEDS – NGC 7603
 Simbad – NGC 7603
 VizieR – NGC 7603
 

Pisces (constellation)
Unbarred spiral galaxies
Seyfert galaxies
7603
092
Interacting galaxies